Kim Yoo-jin (born 26 September 1981) is a South Korean women's international footballer who plays as a midfielder. She is a member of the South Korea women's national football team. She was part of the team at the 2003 FIFA Women's World Cup. On club level she plays for INI Steel in South Korea.

References

External links

1981 births
Living people
South Korean women's footballers
South Korea women's international footballers
Place of birth missing (living people)
2003 FIFA Women's World Cup players
Women's association football midfielders
Incheon Hyundai Steel Red Angels WFC players
WK League players